Stephen Stuchbury (born 22 June 1954 in Sheffield, Yorkshire, England) is an English former first-class cricketer, who played three first-class matches, and 22 List A one day games, for Yorkshire County Cricket Club between 1978 and 1981.

Career
A left arm medium bowler, he took eight wickets at 29.50, with a best of 3 for 82 against Lancashire in a Roses Match.  A left-handed batsman, he scored seven runs with a best of four not out.  He was more successful in one day cricket, taking 29 wickets at 23.34, with a best of 5 for 16 against Leicestershire.  He scored 21 one day runs, with a best of 9 for an average of 5.25.

He also played for the Yorkshire Second XI from 1976 to 1978, and Yorkshire Under-25s from 1973 to 1978.

References

External links
Cricinfo Profile

1954 births
Living people
Yorkshire cricketers
Cricketers from Sheffield
English cricketers
English cricketers of 1969 to 2000